Last Generation may refer to:
 "Last Generation", a song from the album Hide from the Sun by the Finnish rock band The Rasmus
 Last Generation (activists), a climate activist group formed in Berlin in 2021.